The Reformist Bloc was a centre-right electoral alliance in Bulgaria.

History
The coalition agreement to form the alliance was signed on 20 December 2013. The five parties that signed the agreement were: Democrats for a Strong Bulgaria, Bulgaria for Citizens Movement, Union of Democratic Forces, People's Party Freedom and Dignity, and the Bulgarian Agrarian National Union. At the time of signing the coalition the parties had one seat in the European Parliament but none in the National Assembly.

In early August 2014 spokesperson Radan Kanev resigned because of what he said was a lack of unity within the alliance: "The image of a united multi-party coalition was replaced by an image of a traditional coalition with many and often conflicting interests."

He initially supported the government, led by Prime Minister Boyko Borisov. Politicians from the Reformist Bloc received ministerial posts as coalition partners.

In December 2015, DSB turned into opposition because of the discontent with the speed and depth of the judicial reform by the second government of Boyko Borisov. Minister Petar Moskov retained his post but was excluded from his DSB leadership. This event marked a new flaw in the Reformist Bloc. The other coalition partners remained in the government. The Parliamentary Group of the Reformist Bloc does not split up. At the end of 2016 DSB left the block. In February 2017, the People's Party "Freedom and Dignity" left to join Lutvi Mestan's DOST.

Elections
The electoral alliance made its debut in the 2014 European Parliament election. Meglena Kuneva, the leader of Bulgaria for Citizens Movement, was placed as number one on the party's list. However, Svetoslav Malinov from Democrats for Strong Bulgaria won the only place for the alliance in the European Parliament due to the preferential voting in his favour.

Statistics

See also 
 Blue Coalition, a previous centre-right electoral alliance in Bulgaria

References

External links 
 Official Blog of the Reformist Bloc

Conservative parties in Bulgaria
Conservative liberal parties
Liberal parties in Bulgaria
Defunct political party alliances in Bulgaria
2013 establishments in Bulgaria